Green Eyes is a 1953 children's picture book written and illustrated by A. Birnbaum. The book tells the story of a kitten experiencing each season for the first time. The book was a recipient of a 1954 Caldecott Honor for its illustrations.

References

1953 children's books
American picture books
Caldecott Honor-winning works